Fanfan la Tulipe is a 2003 French comedy adventure film directed by Gérard Krawczyk and starring Vincent Perez and Penélope Cruz. It was screened out of competition at the 2003 Cannes Film Festival. It is a remake of the 1952 film Fanfan la Tulipe.

Synopsis
A charming swashbuckler is tricked into enlisting into the army of Louis XV in the mistaken belief that he will therefore be allowed to marry one of the King's daughters.

Cast
Vincent Perez as Fanfan la Tulipe
Penélope Cruz as Adeline la Franchise
Didier Bourdon as Louis XV
Hélène de Fougerolles as Me de Pompadour
Michel Muller as Tranche Montagne
 as Pierre Bras
Jacques Frantz as Franchise
Gérald Laroche as Corsini
Magdalena Mielcarz as Henriette de France
Anna Majcher as Wanda
Guillaume Gallienne as Houlette
 as Marechal
 as L'aumônier
Yves Pignot as Guillaume
Jean-François Lapalus as L'oncle de Lison
 as Le cure
Jacques Dynam as Chaville

Reception
On review aggregator Rotten Tomatoes, Fanfan la Tulipe holds an approval rating of 14%, based on 7 reviews, and an average rating of 5/10.

References

External links

2000s French-language films
French swashbuckler films
2000s historical adventure films
Films directed by Gérard Krawczyk
Films set in the 1760s
French adventure films
Seven Years' War films
Films produced by Luc Besson
Remakes of French films
Cultural depictions of Louis XV
Cultural depictions of Madame de Pompadour
2000s French films

ja:花咲ける騎士道#リメイク